Kldiashvili is a Georgian surname, originally from the province of Imereti. Formerly, the Kldiashvili were listed among the gentry (aznauri) and recognized as such in the Russian Empire in the 19th century.   

Notable people with the name include:

 David Kldiashvili (1862–1931), a Georgian writer 
 Sergo Kldiashvili (1893–1986), a Georgian writer
 Simon Kldiashvili (1865–1920), a Georgian architect

References 

Georgian-language surnames